Roger A. Morse, Ph.D. (July 5, 1927 - May 12, 2000) was an American bee biologist who taught many beekeepers both the rudiments and the finer practices, through his research and publications. During his long career, three new parasites of the honeybee, acarine mite, varroa mite and African small hive beetle were introduced to the United States. These, along with the Africanized honeybee and pesticide kills were all important beekeeping issues. Morse was extensively involved in research on each of these and provided guidance to the beekeeping industry.

Education and career 

Morse was born in Saugerties, New York, and served in the U. S. Army from 1944 to 1947. He received his bachelor's degree from Cornell University in 1950, his masters in 1953 and his doctorate in 1955, and did postgraduate work with the State Plant Board in Gainesville, Florida After a brief stint as assistant professor at the University of Massachusetts Amherst, he returned to Cornell University where he remained until retirement. Morse taught a very popular introductory course on beekeeping, which was available to any student as an elective.  During the 1970s many Cornell students were informed and entertained by his superb relating of the honey bee and its close relationship with human endeavors. He was made chairman of the entomology department in 1986. In 1989 he was made a fellow of the Entomological Society of America, and had been a member of the American Association for the Advancement of Science since 1975. He also served as visiting professor at the University of Helsinki, Finland, the University of Sao Paulo, Brazil, and the University of the Philippines, Los Baños.

Publications 

Morse was a prolific writer of numerous books and magazine articles. He also edited and made contributions to a number of collective works. This is a partial list.

Contributor:
Annotated Bibliography on Varroa Jacobsoni, Tropilaelaps Clareae and Euvarroa Sinhai (IBRA Bibliography)
The ABC and XYZ of Bee Culture
The Illustrated Encyclopedia of Beekeeping
Honey Bee Pests, Predators, and Diseases
Making Mead Honey Wine: History, Recipes, Methods and Equipment
Morse wrote a regular column in Bee Culture magazine

Author:
Bees and Beekeeping
Honey Shows: Guidelines for Exhibitors, Superintendents, and Judges
The New Complete Guide to Beekeeping
Rearing Queen Honey Bees
Richard Archbold and the Archbold Biological Station
A Year in the Beeyard: An Expert's Month-by-Month Instructions for Successful Beekeeping

References

1927 births
2000 deaths
American beekeepers
Cornell University alumni
Cornell University faculty
University of Massachusetts Amherst faculty
Academic staff of the University of São Paulo